The Alexandria Harmonizers are an international champion barbershop chorus based in Alexandria, Virginia.  Numbering 110 men in 2013, the chorus is the performing arm of the Alexandria Chapter of the Barbershop Harmony Society, under the direction of Joseph Cerutti, Jr.  The Harmonizers have performed at the Kennedy Center Honors, Carnegie Hall, Wolf Trap National Park for the Performing Arts, the Supreme Court the Great Wall of China, and the White House. It is a member of several choral associations in addition to the Barbershop Harmony Society, including Chorus America and the Contemporary A Cappella Society of America.

History

The Alexandria, Virginia Chapter of the Barbershop Harmony Society (then SPEBSQSA), was chartered by Dean Snyder, Eugene Barnwell, Jean Boardman and Louis E. Metcalf, and sponsored by the Washington, DC Chapter (the Singing Capital Chorus).  On June 29, 1948, Boardman presented Ed Poole, the president of the newly formed chapter, with the charter for the new Alexandria Chapter. 

The Harmonizers won their first Barbershop Harmony Society International gold medal in 1986, in Salt Lake City and have earned the title three more times since then (1989 Kansas City, 1995 Miami Beach, and 1998 Atlanta).  They have also earned 15 other International medals and are the 2015 Mid-Atlantic District chorus champion.

Musical Directors

1948–1950: Eugene Barnwell, one of the charter members and a "godfather"
1950–1951: Werner Paul
1951–1962: Dr. Harold "Bud" Arberg, Sr.
1963–1970: Oz Newgard
1970–1980: Scott Werner, who directed the Harmonizers to their first BHS International medal in 1978 (they placed 4th)
1980–1983: John Hohl, who directed the Harmonizers to International 3rd place bronze in 1982
1984–2002: Scott Werner, who returned and directed the Harmonizers to all four of their gold medals
2002–2006: Richard Lewellen
2007–present: Joseph Cerutti, Jr., who has directed the Harmonizers to 5 International Bronze medals: 5th place Philadelphia 2010,  5th place Kansas City 2011, 3rd place Toronto 2013, 4th place Pittsburgh 2015, and 3rd place Charlotte 2022.

Discography
Havin' Fun
Live on Stage
Photographs and Memories (cassette; 1990)
The Harmonizers LIVE! (CD; 1997)
Wee Small Hours (CD; 2002)
Comfort and Joy (CD; 2005)
Choir of the World (CD; 2010)
American Icon (CD; 2015)

Awards and recognition

Mid-Atlantic District Chorus Champion 25 times — 1978, 1979, 1980, 1982, 1983, 1986, 1989, 1992, 1993, 1994, 1995, 1998, 2001, 2002, 2003, 2004, 2005, 2006, 2007, 2008, 2009, 2010, 2012, 2014, 2015

See also
Barbershop Harmony Society
Barbershop music
A cappella music

External links
Official website
Chapter Entry in Mid-Atlantic District of the Barbershop Harmony Society

Barbershop Harmony Society choruses
Choirs in Virginia
Musical groups established in 1948